Nathan Washington "Big'n" Dougherty (March 23, 1886 – May 18, 1977) was a Hall of Fame college football player for the Tennessee Volunteers football team.  He later became the Dean of the College of Engineering at the University of Tennessee and chairman of its Athletic Council. For this as well as his playing days Dougherty is "considered by many to be the founding father of UT Athletics." Dougherty was inducted into the College Football Hall of Fame in 1967, and was a unanimous choice for the Associated Press Southeast Area All-Time football team 1869–1919 era.

Playing career

University of Tennessee 

Dougherty played football and basketball at the University of Tennessee. He came to the university from Scott County, Virginia.

Football 
Dougherty played guard for the Tennessee Volunteers from 1906 to 1909, standing 6-foot-2 and weighing 185 pounds. Dougherty was a standout in the sport before it became wildly popular around the country.  Of the few accolades that were bestowed on individuals, Dougherty was an honoree. He was named to the All Southern team in 1907 and 1908.

1908 
The 1908 team was widely considered the best Tennessee football season up to that point. The backfield included Walker Leach. Vanderbilt coach Dan McGugin noted "All things considered, Leach was perhaps the best football player of the year in  Dixie."

1909 
He was captain of the football team in 1909.

Basketball

1908–09 
Dougherty was captain of the Tennessee Volunteers men's basketball team in 1908–09.

Coaching 
Dougherty coached the George Washington University's basketball team during the 1914–15 season, and compiled a 5–9 record.

Educator 
Dougherty was dean of the University of Tennessee College of Engineering at Knoxville from 1940 to 1956. He was also the chairman of the UT Athletic Council from 1917 to 1956. An engineering building at the school is named after him.  The building  caught fire in November 2006, but was later reopened.

Dougherty was instrumental in the establishment of the Southern Conference, being its first secretary-treasurer.

References

External links 
 Tennessee Hall of Fame profile

1886 births
1977 deaths
American football guards
George Washington Colonials men's basketball coaches
Tennessee Volunteers football players
Tennessee Volunteers basketball players
All-Southern college football players
College Football Hall of Fame inductees
People from Scott County, Virginia
Players of American football from Virginia
Basketball players from Virginia
American men's basketball players